Björn Thomas Hellberg (29 September 1941 – 22 January 2023) was a Swedish actor.

Hellberg died on 22 January 2023, at the age of 81.

Selected filmography
Maria (1975)
The Man on the Roof (1976)
Buddies (1976)
The Assignment (1977)
Raskenstam (1983)
Mannen från Mallorca (1984)
Zingo (1998)
Vintergatan 5a (as Alien's voice) (2000)
Break Even (2005)

References

External links

1941 births
2023 deaths
Male actors from Stockholm